Artie “Hart” Miller was an early professional American football player for the Homestead Library & Athletic Club in 1900 and 1901, as well as the Pittsburgh Stars of the first National Football League. He played the position of halfback. Before the start of the 1902 season, Miller was working as a lumberjack in Wisconsin.

Prior to playing professionally, Miller attended and played football at, the Carlisle Indian School. According to school records, Miller arrived at the school in 1891 and graduated in 1900. By 1910, he was living Gresham, Wisconsin, working in a saw mill and still playing football.

References
Carlisle record

Year of birth missing
Year of death missing
Carlisle Indians football players
Homestead Library & Athletic Club players
Pittsburgh Stars players